The list of shipwrecks in 1992 includes ships sunk, foundered, grounded, or otherwise lost during 1992.

January

5 January

7 January

12 January

13 January

16 January

18 January

24 January

28 January

February

1 February

4 February

11 February

16 February

22 February

23 February

29 February

March

3 March

25 March

27 March

Unknown date

April

17 April

26 April

May

6 May

12 May

17 May

23 May

25 May

26 May

June

18 June

21 June

23 June

24 June

30 June

July

5 July

9 July

14 July

21 July

25 July

26 July

August

4 August

6 August

12 August

13 August

21 August

22 August

23 August

27 August

28 August

September

1 September

2 September

3 September

7 September

11 September

18 September

22 September

28 September

Unknown date

October

2 October

12 October

14 October

20 October

22 October

28 October

Unknown date

November

4 November

9 November

22 November

30 November

December

3 December

15 December

18 December

19 December

23 December

31 December

Unknown date

References

1992
 
Ship